Güneytepe can refer to:

 Güneytepe, Keban
 Güneytepe, Şuhut